Baruni is a Croatian pop band originating from Zagreb. The group was formed in 1991. The name "Baruni" (Croatian for "Barons") was given to them by Tomislav Ivčić. The group was previously signed to Croatia Records, but is currently working with rival Hit Records. They release their albums through in Bosnia through the label Hayat Production. They have been participated in the Croatian Radio Festival seven times and in the Etnofest Neum festival twice.

Band members
Miroslav Rus – songwriter
Danijel Banić – lead vocal
Jadranko Jagarinec – bass guitar
Dubravko Jagarinec – acoustic guitar
Jelena Domazet – keyboard
Zvonimir Domazet – electric guitar
Miroslav Budanko – drums

Albums
 Putuju i oblaci (1996)
 Vrati se (1997)
 Ulica Ilica (1998)
 Cirkus (1999)
 Otkad s tobom ne spavam (2002)
 Ljubav nosi tvoje ime (2003)
 Svanut' će jutro puno ljubavi (2007)

Singles
 Neka pati koga smeta, Hrvatska je prvak svijeta (1998)

Compilations
 Veliki hitovi 1 (2000)
 Najbolje od najboljeg (2006)
 Zlatna kolekcija (2011)

Sources

External links

Croatian pop music groups
Hayat Production artists
Musical groups established in 1991
1991 establishments in Croatia